Thomas Scott Davidson (March 11, 1858 – June 6, 1933) was a Canadian politician and auctioneer. He represented Brant North in the Legislative Assembly of Ontario from 1914 to 1919 as a Liberal member.

He was born in South Dumfries Township, Canada West, the son of James Davidson. He served on the council for Brant County and was warden in 1900. In 1892, he married Marion Bullock. He was an unsuccessful candidate for a seat in the federal parliament in 1926. He died in Paris, Ontario in 1933.

External links 

History of the county of Brant, FD Reville (1920)
Members of Provincial Parliament, Brantford Public Library

1858 births
1933 deaths
Ontario Liberal Party MPPs
People from the County of Brant